Jochen Pollex (born 6 June 1947) is a German former basketball player. He competed in the men's tournament at the 1972 Summer Olympics.

References

External links
 

1947 births
Living people
People from Wismar
German men's basketball players
Sportspeople from Mecklenburg-Western Pomerania
Olympic basketball players of West Germany
Basketball players at the 1972 Summer Olympics